Helana Sawires is an Australian actress best known for portraying the lead role of Dianne, a medical student, in the first Australian Muslim romantic comedy film, Ali's Wedding (2017). She also appeared in 2016 short film Banana Boy, directed by Steven Woodburn.

She lives in Marrickville where she grew up in a large Egyptian family with five siblings. She went to Sydney's Newtown High School of the Performing Arts. She is also a drummer and Egyptian tabla player.

Her role as Dianne in Ali's Wedding brought her a nomination for Best Actress at the Australian Academy of Cinema and Television Arts (AACTA) Awards.

Filmography

Film

Television

References

Living people
Year of birth missing (living people)
21st-century Australian actresses
People from Marrickville
Australian people of Egyptian descent